Aeshna crenata, the Siberian hawker, is a species of dragonfly in the family Aeshnidae. It is found in Belarus, Finland, Latvia, Lithuania, and Russia.

This dragonfly is commonly found on freshwater lakes in forested areas.

References 

Aeshnidae
Insects described in 1856
Odonata of Europe
Taxa named by Hermann August Hagen
Taxonomy articles created by Polbot